Sheykh Teymur may refer to:
 Sheykh Teymur, North Khorasan
 Sheykh Teymur, West Azerbaijan